The Kaohsiug Refinery was an oil refinery in Nanzi District, Kaohsiung, Taiwan.

History
The construction for the refinery was firstly proposed in 1987. The refinery was closed in 2015 and its refinery activities were transferred to Dalin Refinery.

Architecture
The refinery spanned over an area of 273 hectares. It had a capacity to process 220,000 barrel of crude oil per day.

See also
 List of oil refineries
 Mining in Taiwan

References

2015 disestablishments in Taiwan
Buildings and structures in Kaohsiung
Demolished buildings and structures in Taiwan
Oil refineries in Taiwan